Dyspessa aculeata is a species of moth of the family Cossidae. It was described by Turati in 1909. It is found on Sicily.

References

Moths described in 1909
Dyspessa
Moths of Europe